Farm to Market Roads in Texas are owned and maintained by the Texas Department of Transportation (TxDOT).

FM 2100

Farm to Market Road 2100 (FM 2100) is located in Harris County, connecting Huffman and Highlands. The northern terminus is at FM 1485 (Huffman-Cleveland Road) and the southern terminus is at FM 1942.

On September 29, 1954, the road was extended north  to FM 1008 (now FM 1960) at Huffman. On July 11, 1968, the road was extended north  to Wolf Road. On September 29, 1977, it was extended northwest . On June 27, 1995, the section from UR 1960 to US 90 was transferred to UR 2100. On August 28, 2003, by district request, the road was extended north to FM 1485. On November 15, 2018, UR 2100 was changed back to FM 2100.

Junction list

FM 2101

Farm to Market Road 2101 (FM 2101) is located in Hunt County.

The southern terminus of FM 2101 is at  SH 34 northeast of Quinlan. From this location, the roadway travels to the east and briefly dips southward toward Lake Tawakoni before turning northward, roughly paralleling SH 34 for its entire length. The route enters the city of Greenville and ends at  FM 1570 at the western edge of Majors Airport.

The route was extended northward, first to  FM 1564 on September 27, 1960, and then to the current northern terminus at FM 1570 on May 7, 1970.

Junction list

FM 2102

Farm to Market Road 2102 (FM 2102) is located in Karnes County.

FM 2102 begins at an intersection with FM 99 near Fashing. The highway travels in a mostly eastern direction and has a brief overlap with FM 626 west of Kenedy. FM 2102 continues to run in a more eastern direction before ending at an intersection with SH 72 in Kenedy.

The highway was extended  from FM 626 to FM 99 on May 6, 1964.

Junction list

FM 2102 (1953)

On October 26, 1954, the highway was extended west  to the Hunt County line. This extension was short-lived, as the highway was cancelled and combined with FM 35 on November 29, 1954.

FM 2103

Farm to Market Road 2103 (FM 2103) is located in southern Childress County.

FM 2103 begins at an intersection with County Road DD/County Road 5. The highway travels in a mostly eastern direction before ending at an intersection with US 62/US 83.

The highway was extended  to another road intersection on November 21, 1956.

FM 2104

Farm to Market Road 2104 (FM 2104) is located in Bastrop County. The highway travels from FM 153 near Smithville to US 290 in Paige.

The highway was extended  to FM 153 on November 21, 1956.

Junction list

FM 2105

Farm to Market Road 2105 (FM 2105) is located in Tom Green County.

FM 2105 begins at US 87 between Grape Creek and San Angelo. The highway runs east just north of San Angelo and intersects SH 208 before ending at an intersection with US 277.

The current FM 2105 was designated on October 31, 1957, along its current route. Despite running through more rural areas outside of the city, the entirety of the route was redesignated Urban Road 2105 (UR 2105) on June 27, 1995. The designation reverted to FM 2105 with the elimination of the Urban Road system on November 15, 2018.

FM 2105 (1953)

The highway was cancelled on November 1, 1954, with the mileage being transferred to FM 597.

FM 2106

Farm to Market Road 2106 (FM 2106) is a short north-south highway located in Garza County.

FM 2106 begins at an intersection with County Road 180 and runs north through rural areas of the county before ending at an intersection with US 84 in Southland.

FM 2106 was designated on October 28, 1953, along the current route.

Junction list

FM 2107

Farm to Market Road 2107 (FM 2107) is located in Bandera County in the Texas Hill Country.

FM 2107 begins at a point on North Prong Creek Road and runs southeast for approximately  before ending at an intersection with SH 16 northwest of Medina. FM 2107 runs parallel to the North Prong Medina River for its entire length.

The highway was extended  on October 13, 1954.

FM 2108

Farm to Market Road 2108 (FM 2108) is located in Angelina County, traveling just south of Lufkin.

FM 2108 begins at an intersection with US 59 north of Burke near the Angelina County Airport. The highway travels through an area that is mixed between rural and suburban. FM 2108 ends at an intersection with FM 58.

FM 2108 was designated on October 28, 1953, along the current route.

Junction list

FM 2109

Farm to Market Road 2109 (FM 2109) is located in Angelina County.

FM 2109 runs from FM 1669 in Huntington to SH 147 in Zavalla. The highway travels in an eastern direction from FM 1669 to the Sam Rayburn Reservoir near County Road 198. FM 2109 then turns south and runs through the Angelina National Forest and runs closely to the lake.

The highway was extended  westward to FM 1669 on March 23, 1954. FM 2109 was extended  to Ora on November 21, 1956. The highway was extended  to SH 147 on September 30, 1964, absorbing FM 2662 in the process.

Junction list

FM 2110

Farm to Market Road 2110 (FM 2110) is located in Houston County.

The highway was extended  southwestward on September 29, 1977.

Junction list

FM 2111

Farm to Market Road 2111 (FM 2111) is located in Runnels County.

FM 2111 begins at an intersection with FM 2133. The highway crosses the Colorado River and runs just west of the Ballinger City Lake. FM 2111 intersects SH 158 northwest of Ballinger. The highway travels through more rural areas north of SH 158 and ends at an intersection with SH 153/FM 384 west of Winters.

The highway was extended  to SH 158 on October 31, 1958. FM 2111 was extended  to FM 2133 on May 7, 1970.

FM 2111 (1953)

The highway was extended west  to FM 225 on August 24, 1955. The highway was cancelled on September 30, 1955, with the mileage being transferred to FM 225.

FM 2112

Farm to Market Road 2112 (FM 2112) is located in Nacogdoches County.

FM 2112 begins at an intersection with SH 7 east of Nacogdoches. The highway runs through wooded areas just east of the city and ends at an intersection with FM 1878.

The highway was extended to FM 1878 on October 13, 1954.

Junction list

FM 2113

Farm to Market Road 2113 (FM 2113) is located in McLennan County, running from Moody to Hewitt.

FM 2113 begins at an intersection with FM 107 in Moody and runs northeast through mostly rural farm land. The highway turns in a more eastern direction after an intersection with FM 2416 and passes by a few subdivisions near FM 2837. FM 2113 enters Hewitt and almost immediately has an interchange with FM 1695. The highway runs through suburban areas of Hewitt along Spring Valley Road before ending at a junction with I-35/FM 2063.

The highway was extended  southwestward on October 26, 1954. The road was extended  to FM 107 at Moody on July 28, 1955. On June 27, 1995, the section of FM 2113 between FM 1695 and I-35 was redesignated Urban Road 2113 (UR 2113). The designation reverted to FM 2113 with the elimination of the Urban Road system on November 15, 2018.

Junction list

FM 2114

Farm to Market Road 2114 (FM 2114) is located in Central Texas, running from FM 56 southeast of Laguna Park to SH 171 in Hubbard.

FM 2114 begins at an intersection with FM 56 southeast of Laguna Park near Lake Whitney. The highway travels in a mostly eastern direction before turning south near Smiths Bend and turns back to the east after crossing the Brazos River. FM 2114 turns to the northeast at FM 1304 west and the two highways have a brief overlap with FM 2114 turning southeast at FM 1304 east. The highway enters into McLennan County at County Line Road and travels along T.M. West Parkway and enters West near I-35/US 77. FM 2114 travels along Oak Street through the town and turns onto Cottonwood Road at FM 2311. The highway leaves West and travels in a northeast direction to Penelope where it has a brief overlap with FM 308. After leaving Penelope, FM 2114 travels in an eastward direction to Hubbard, where it ends at an intersection with SH 171.

FM 2114 was extended eastward to FM 308 in Penelope on June 28, 1963. FM 2114 was extended westward to FM 56 and eastward to SH 171 in Hubbard on July 24, 1963; this extension replaced FM 2411 and FM 1888.

Junction list

FM 2115

Farm to Market Road 2115 (FM 2115) is located in Bell County.

FM 2115 begins at an intersection with FM 487 east of Jarrell and ends at I-35 south of Salado.

FM 2115 was designated on October 28, 1953, along the current route.

FM 2116

Farm to Market Road 2116 (FM 2116) is located in Milam County.

FM 2116 begins at a point on a county road near Alcoa Lake. The highway travels in a mostly northeast direction and ends at an intersection with FM 487 south of Praesel.

FM 2116 (1953)

The highway was cancelled on April 22, 1958, with the mileage being transferred to FM 434.

FM 2117

FM 2118

FM 2119

Farm to Market Road 2119 (FM 2119) is located in Reeves and Culberson counties.

The western terminus of FM 2119 is at Duval Rd. at Rustler Springs in unincorporated Culberson County. I-20-B near Pecos.

FM 2119 was established on October 28, 1953, as a  road from its current southern terminus at Bus. I-20-B (then US 80) near Pecos.

FM 2120

FM 2121

FM 2122

FM 2123

FM 2124

FM 2125

FM 2126

Farm to Market Road 2126 (FM 2126) runs from FM 45 east to a junction with U.S. Highways 84 and 183. FM 2126 forms a portion of a beltway around the southeast side of Brownwood. It was designated on October 28, 1953.

FM 2126 starts south of Brownwood where FM 45 turns south toward Richland Springs and continues northeast on the outskirts of Brownwood to its terminus just south of Early.

FM 2126 also provides Early with a way to get south and southwest without having to go through Brownwood by connecting to FM 45, which in turn connects to US 190 near Richland Springs and US 377 about 2 miles west of the western terminus. FM 2126 was designated on October 28, 1953, along its current route.

Junction list

FM 2127

Farm to Market Road 2127 (FM 2127) is located in northeastern Jack, far southwestern Montague, and northwestern Wise counties.

FM 2127 is a two-lane route for its entire length. It begins in Jack County at a junction with  SH 148 between Jacksboro and Henrietta. The route travels generally to the east, through the community of Postoak. It intersects  SH 59 south of Newport before turning to the southeast. The roadway briefly enters Montague County for about a half mile before reentering Jack County. FM 2127 continues into Wise County and to Crafton before turning to the south and reaching its terminus at  FM 1810 near Lake Bridgeport.

The current designation of FM 2127 was established in Wise County on December 19, 1955, from  SH 24 (now part of FM 1810) to Crafton. The route was extended into Jack County to FM 1125 on June 2, 1967, and further lengthened through Montague County over the western portion of FM 1125 to SH 148 on August 16 of the following year, bringing FM 2127 to its current routing.

Junction list

FM 2127 (1953)

The highway was cancelled on October 15, 1954, with the highway being combined with FM 2068.

FM 2128

Farm to Market Road 2128 (FM 2128) is located in Hidalgo County in the Rio Grande Valley.

FM 2128 begins at an intersection with Bus. US 281 (Closner Boulevard) in Edinburg. The highway travels along Schunior Street through a residential area northeast of downtown. FM 2128 has a junction with I-69C/US 281 with Schunior Street becoming Richardson Road and runs through suburban areas of Cesar Chavez before entering an unincorporated area of the county. The highway continues to run through suburban areas before ending at an intersection with SH 107.

The current FM 2128 was designated on December 16, 1957, along the current route. The entire highway was internally re-designated as Urban Road 2128 (UR 2128) on June 27, 1995. The designation reverted to FM 2128 with the elimination of the Urban Road system on November 15, 2018.

FM 2128 (1953)

The highway was cancelled and combined with FM 818 on September 30, 1954.

FM 2128 (1955)

The highway was extended  to another road intersection near Black Jack Church on November 21, 1956. FM 2128 was cancelled on November 29, 1957, with the mileage being transferred to FM 908.

FM 2129

Farm to Market Road 2129 (FM 2129) is located in Schleicher and Sutton counties.

FM 2129 begins at an intersection with RM 1312 and ends at an intersection with US 277 south of Eldorado.

The highway was extended  southwestward on September 27, 1960. FM 2129 was extended  to US 290 (now RM 1312) on June 2, 1967.

FM 2129 (1953)

The road was extended north  to FM 54 on October 26, 1954. The designation was cancelled and the route's mileage was combined with that of FM 303 on December 31, 1954.

FM 2130

Farm to Market Road 2130 (FM 2130) is located in eastern Hockley County in the South Plains region.

FM 2130 begins at an intersection with SH 114 east of Smyer. The highway runs in a mostly northern direction and intersects FM 2641 and has an overlap with FM 1294 before intersecting US 84 in the town of Roundup. FM 2130 continues to run north before ending at an intersection with FM 597 east of Anton.

The highway was extended  from US 84 to SH 290 (now SH 114) on October 26, 1954.

Junction list

FM 2131

FM 2132

FM 2133

FM 2134

FM 2134 was designated October 28, 1953. On October 31, 1957, FM 2134 was changed to RM 2134. On May 5, 1992, RM 2134 was changed back to FM 2134.

FM 2135

FM 2135 (1953)

FM 2135 was cancelled on October 4, 1960, and transferred to FM 1828.

FM 2136

FM 2137

FM 2137 was designated on October 28, 1953.

FM 2138

RM 2139

Ranch to Market Road 2139 (RM 2139) is located in Sterling County.

State maintenance for RM 2139 begins at a point on Old Big Lake Road southwest of Sterling City. The highway travels in a northeast direction through highly rural areas and ends at an intersection with SH 163.

The highway was extended  on October 21, 1981.

FM 2139 (1953)

The highway was cancelled and combined with FM 752 on January 31, 1972.

FM 2140

FM 2141

FM 2142

FM 2142 (1953)

On September 27, 1954, the road was extended northwest  to FM 1088 (now FM 949). FM 2142 was cancelled on October 15, 1954, and became a portion of FM 1094.

FM 2143

FM 2144

FM 2145

FM 2146

Farm to Market Road 2146 (FM 2146) is located in Atascosa County.

FM 2146 begins at an intersection with FM 1333 north of Charlotte. The highway travels in a more eastern direction and turns northeast at County Road 300. FM 2146 has a brief overlap with SH 173 northwest of Jourdanton and runs through the town of Amphion. The highway continues to run in a northeast direction and ends at an intersection with FM 476 northwest of Poteet.

The highway was extended southwestward of SH 173 on September 5, 1973, absorbing FM 3235 in the process.

Junction list

RM 2147

Ranch to Market Road 2147 (RM 2147) is located in Llano and Burnet counties.

RM 2147 begins at an intersection with SH 71 near Horseshoe Bay. The highway travels through Horseshoe Bay and Cottonwood Shores, running parallel to the Colorado River, Lake LBJ and Lake Marble Falls. RM 2147 enters the southern portion of Marble Falls and begins an overlap with US 281. The two highways travel south and RM 2147 leaves the overlap and travels in a mostly eastward direction before ending at County Road 402.

The highway was extended  to RM 93 (now SH 71) on June 28, 1963.

Junction list

FM 2147 (1953)

FM 2147 became part of FM 472 on May 18, 1954, and FM 2147 was reassigned to an  route from FM 472 to US 81 at Moore that was a redesignation of the old route of FM 472. FM 2147 was cancelled on December 16, 1959, with the mileage being transferred to FM 462.

FM 2148

FM 2149

FM 2150

Farm to Market Road 2150 (FM 2150) is located in Lubbock and Crosby counties.

FM 2150 begins at an intersection with Bus. US 84 in Slaton. The highway travels in an eastern direction through rural areas and enters Crosby County before state maintenance ends at County Road 254.

The highway was extended  eastward to the Crosby county line on November 24, 1959. FM 2150 was extended eastward  on November 3, 1972.

FM 2150 (1953)

The highway was cancelled and combined with FM 161 on November 1, 1954.

FM 2151

Farm to Market Road 2151 (FM 2151) was located in Cass County. No highway currently uses the FM 2151 designation.

The highway was cancelled on June 5, 1987, with the mileage being transferred to FM 3129.

FM 2152

FM 2153

Farm to Market Road 2153 (FM 2153) is located in Denton County, running from FM 2164 east of Sanger to FM 428 northeast of Denton.

The highway was extended  to FM 2164 in 1960.

FM 2153 (1953)

On October 13, 1954, the road was extended north  to the Live Oak county line. This extension was short-lived, as the highway was cancelled and combined with FM 99 on October 27, 1954.

FM 2154

It is known as Wellborn Rd in Bryan and College Station. It passes through the cities of Millican, Wellborn, College Station, and Bryan. It is considered to be "Old Hwy 6"; however, both Business Highway 6 and the new Highway 6 are to its east.

For the majority of this road, there is a Union Pacific Railroad line that runs parallel to it; the railroad is the dividing line between the "Main Campus" and the "West Campus" of Texas A&M University.

A historical marker, located north of Millican, is adjacent to the road.

FM 2154 was designated on October 28, 1953, from FM 60 in College Station southeast and south  to Wellborn. On October 31, 1958, the road was extended  to Millican. On May 6, 1964, a  section from Millican to SH 6 was added and the currency with FM 159 in Millican was removed. On December 14, 1989, a  section from the end of the route to FM 1179 was added. On June 1, 1991, a new one way pair was proposed between FM 2154 and Farm to Market Road 3518 between FM 60 and FM 1179, replacing FM 3518, but this was not included in the mileage of FM 2154 as it was a one-way pair. On June 27, 1995, the section from UR 2818 to UR 1179 was transferred to UR 2154. However, since the conditions for extension of FM 2154 were not met, FM 2154 was truncated to FM 60. On November 15, 2018, UR 2154 was changed back to FM 2154.

Junction list

FM 2155

FM 2156

FM 2157

Farm to Market Road 2157 (FM 2157) is a proposed road from FM 700 southwestward  to US 87 in Big Spring.

FM 2157 (1953)

The original FM 2157 was designated on October 28, 1953, from US 281 in Stephenville east  to a road intersection. On August 24, 1955, the road was extended east  to a road intersection in Cedar Point. On May 6, 1964, the road was extended east . On November 25, 1975, the road was extended east and north  to the county line. On January 2, 1976, the road was extended northeast  to US 377 west of Tolar, replacing FM 2870, but six months later this section was transferred back to FM 2870 while FM 2157 was rerouted to FM 204 near Paluxy. FM 2157 was cancelled on December 20, 1984, by district request and transferred to FM 205; at the same time, FM 204 was transferred to FM 51.

FM 2158

FM 2159

FM 2160

FM 2160 (1953)

The original FM 2160 was designated on October 29, 1953, from US 75 at New Waverly northwest  to a road intersection. FM 2160 was cancelled on September 29, 1955, and transferred to FM 1374.

FM 2161

FM 2162

FM 2163

FM 2164

Farm to Market Road 2164 (FM 2164) is located in Denton County.

FM 2164 begins at an intersection with US 77 in Denton. The highway travels along N. Locust Street and travels through suburban areas of the city with the route becoming more rural north of Loop 288. FM 2164 leaves the city near FM 3163 and travels through farm land with some rural subdivisions and has a brief overlap with FM 455 in eastern Sanger near the southwestern shore of Lake Ray Roberts. The highway ends at an intersection with FM 1190 west of the lake.

The highway was extended  to a road intersection north of Clear Creek on October 31, 1957. FM 2164 was extended to FM 455 on January 24, 1959. The section of highway between US 77 and Loop 288 was internally redesignated as Urban Road 2164 (UR 2164) on June 27, 1995. The designation reverted to FM 2164 with the elimination of the Urban Road system on November 15, 2018.

Junction list

FM 2165

RM 2166

FM 2166

FM 2167
Farm to Market Road 2167 (FM 2167) is a designation that has been used twice. No highway currently uses the FM 2167 designation.

FM 2167 (1953)

The first FM 2167 was designated on October 28, 1953, from US 83 in Wheeler southwest and west  to a road intersection. On May 26, 1954, the eastern terminus was moved to SH 152. On October 31, 1957, the road was extended west and south  to a point across the Red River. FM 2167 was cancelled on June 1, 1962, and transferred to FM 2473.

FM 2167 (1963)

The second FM 2167 was designated on March 21, 1963, from SH 256 9.5 miles east of Silverton, south  to the Haynes Boy Scout Camp (now Caprock Canyons State Park and Trailway). This route was formerly FM 1986 from 1954 to 1956. TxDOT stopped maintaining the road on February 3, 1982, after a locked gate was set up across the road, although it retained the FM designation. FM 2167 was cancelled and removed from the state highway system on October 27, 1994, because the road was blocked by the gate.

FM 2168

FM 2169

Farm to Market Road 2169 (FM 2169) is located in Kimble County in the Texas Hill Country.

FM 2169 begins at an intersection with US 377 in Junction. The highway runs south along Flatorck Lane and leaves the Junction city limits after crossing the South Llano River and turns to the east near the campus of Texas Tech University at Junction and runs through hilly terrain and intersects with Loop 481. FM 2169 has a short overlap with Loop 481 and leaves the overlap near Lake Junction before re-entering Junction along Martinez Street and interchanging with I-10/US 83. The highway traverses hilly terrain, running east and south before meeting I-10 again, this time in Segovia. FM 2169 continues to run through hills and intersects with RM 479 before ending at I-10 northwest of Mountain Home.

The highway was extended  to US 290 near Segovia on October 31. 1957. The highway was extended  over an old section of US 290 on November 31, 1969, with the construction of I-10. FM 2169 was extended  along Flatrock Lane in Junction to US 377 on January 28, 2010.

Junction list

FM 2170

Farm to Market Road 2170 (FM 2170) is located in Collin County.

FM 2170 begins at an intersection with FM 2551 (Angel Parkway) in Allen. The highway travels east and enters Lucas near Lovejoy High School. FM 2170 travels through the Lovejoy area and ends at an intersection with FM 1378 (Country Club Road). The highway is known as Main Street in Allen and Estates Parkway in Lucas.

The highway was extended  southeastward of US 75 to a road intersection in Parker on October 26, 1954. On September 27, 1957, FM 2319 was cancelled in exchange for extending FM 2448 (later became part of FM 2478, but this section was given to the city in 1988; FM 2448 was reassigned to another route) north from Bethany to SH 121. FM 2170 was re-routed again on October 31, 1958, with part of FM 2170 absorbing a section of FM 2551 with part of the old FM 2170 becoming a part of FM 1378. The highway was extended  to FM 2478 on June 28, 1963. The entire highway was internally redesignated as Urban Road 2170 (UR 2170) on June 27, 1995. On August 28, 1997, the section west of SH 5 was given to the city of Allen. On September 30, 2004, the section west of FM 2551 as given to the city of Allen. The designation of the remaining segment of UR 2170 reverted to FM 2170 with the elimination of the Urban Road system on November 15, 2018.

FM 2171

FM 2172

FM 2173

Farm to Market Road 2173 (FM 2173) was located in southwest Bexar County.

FM 2173 was designated on October 28, 1953, from US 81 (now I-35), 1.5 miles south of Von Ormy, north  to Macdona. On September 21, 1955, a  section from US 81 to FM 1518 at Somerset was added. On January 27, 1971, a section from Macdona to a point 1.32 miles south was cancelled.

FM 2174

FM 2175

FM 2176

Farm to Market Road 2176 (FM 2176) is located in Potter County, mostly traveling through more rural areas of northwestern Amarillo.

FM 2176 begins where Broadway Drive and Hughes Street intersect one another. The highway travels in a northern direction along Broadway Drive and runs along the western edge of the Ross Golf Course until intersecting Hastings Avenue. FM 2176 passes a vineyard and leaves the city limits at an interchange with Loop 335. The highway briefly travels through suburban areas of unincorporated Potter County and turns east onto Givens Avenue and ends at FM 1719.

FM 2176 was designated on October 29, 1953, along its current route, except it extended north to US 87/US 287. The route was redesignated Urban Road 2176 (UR 2176) in 1995. On March 31, 2005, the section along Givens Avenue was transferred to FM 1719. The designation of the remaining segment of UR 2176 reverted to FM 2176 with the elimination of the Urban Road system on November 15, 2018.

FM 2177

FM 2178

FM 2179

FM 2180

FM 2181

Farm to Market Road 2181 (FM 2181) is located in the northern part of the Dallas-Fort Worth Metroplex. The highway runs as a "loop" of I-35E, serving many housing developments in Corinth, Copper Canyon, and Denton.

FM 2181 begins at an intersection with I-35E in southern Corinth, near Lake Dallas and Hickory. To the east of this intersection, the road continues as Swisher Road towards the Lewisville Lake Toll Bridge.

FM 2181 runs as an east-west highway from I-35E to Old Alton Road, despite being signed north-south. The highway turns north, running through the southern part of Denton. At Teasley Road, the highway turns west-east again, and then turns north-south, before ending at I-35E a few miles southeast of UNT. Teasley Road continues north of I-35 as a local road.

As of 2015 the stretch between I-35E in Corinth and FM 2499 is being widened to a divided highway to accommodate urban growth.

The current FM 2181 was designated on September 21, 1955, from BUS US 77 south . On May 2, 1962, it was extended south and east  to IH-35E. On May 16, 1988, the section from US 77 south to IH-35E was removed from the state highway system. In 1995, the route was redesignated Urban Road 2181 (UR 2181). The designation reverted to FM 2181 with the elimination of the Urban Road system on November 15, 2018.

Junction list

FM 2181 (1953)

FM 2181 was designated on October 28, 1953, from SH 199 (now SH 114), 1.2 miles southeast of Wendover, south and west  to a road intersection. FM 2181 was cancelled on August 21, 1955, and transferred to FM 1285.

FM 2182

FM 2182 (1953)

The original FM 2182 was designated on October 29, 1953, from SH 25, 1.1 mile south of Electra, southwest  to a road intersection. FM 2182 was cancelled on February 2, 1959, and transferred to FM 1811.

FM 2183

FM 2183 (1953)

The original FM 2183 was designated on October 29, 1953, from US 70, northwest  to the Foard County line. FM 2183 was cancelled on November 1, 1955, and transferred to FM 98.

FM 2184

FM 2185

Farm to Market Road 2185 (FM 2185) is located in Culberson County in West Texas.

The southern terminus of FM 2185 is at SH 54 in Van Horn. FM 2118 follows East 9th Street east out of Van Horn towards Culberson County Airport. It has an intersection with FM 2809. The highway continues northward to RM 652.

FM 2185 was established on October 28, 1953, as a  road from its current southern terminus at SH 54 in Van Horn, northeastward to Wild Horse Farming District. On July 11, 1968, the highway was extended approximately  northeastward. On August 27, 2020, the deleted portions of FM 2185 were restored, replacing FM 3541 and returning the road to its previous length.

FM 2186

Farm to Market Road 2186 (FM 2186) is located in Randall County, running southwest of Amarillo.

FM 2186 begins at an intersection with Bushland Road near a rural subdivision. The highway travels east along Hollywood Road through mostly rural areas of Randall County. FM 2186 passes by a subdivision near FM 2590 and enters Amarillo before ending at an intersection with Loop 335.

Part of FM 2186 was transferred to Loop 335 when that highway was extended around southern and western Amarillo in 1977. On April 26, 2018, the section of FM 2186 from Helium Road to FM 2590 (old intersection of Loop 335) was transferred to Loop 335 when it was rerouted.

FM 2186 (1953)

The highway was cancelled on March 24, 1958, with the mileage being transferred to RM 2034.

FM 2187

FM 2187 (1953)

The original FM 2187 was designated on October 29, 1953, from FM 630, south  to SH 9 (now I-37) at Edroy. On October 31, 1957, the road was extended north  from FM 630 to a road intersection. FM 2187 was cancelled on July 24, 1963, and transferred to FM 796.

FM 2188

FM 2188 (1953)

The original FM 2188 was designated on December 2, 1953, from SH 175 in Montague northwest  to a county road. FM 2188 was cancelled on January 10, 1957, and transferred to FM 1806.

FM 2189

FM 2189 (1953)

The first use of the FM 2189 designation was in Bailey County, from SH 214, 3 miles north of Enochs, east  to FM 54. FM 2189 was cancelled on September 19, 1968, and became a portion of FM 37.

RM 2189

RM 2189 was cancelled on July 31, 1974, and removed from the highway system due to a lack of traffic on the route.

FM 2190

FM 2190 (1953)

The original FM 2190 was designated on December 2, 1953, from FM 1760, 7.5 miles east of the TX/NM state line, north  to the Palmer County line. Eleven months later FM 2190 was cancelled and transferred to FM 1731.

FM 2191

FM 2192

Farm to Market Road 2192 (FM 2192) is located in Lubbock and Lynn counties in the South Plains region.

FM 2192 begins at an intersection with FM 211 near Wilson. The highway travels in a mostly northern direction, briefly running in a western direction at Lynn County Road 2. FM 2192 enters into Lubbock County just south of County Road 7900 (210th Street). The highway ends at an intersection with FM 41, with the roadway continuing north as County Road 2730 (which eventually becomes FM 3431).

The highway was extended  to FM 41 on February 1, 1957.

FM 2193

Farm to Market Road 2193 (FM 2193) is located in Washington County. It runs from SH 105 east to FM 1155.

FM 2193 was designated on October 29, 1953, from SH 90 (now SH 105), 8 miles northeast of Brenham, east  to a road intersection. On August 24, 1955, the road was extended south  to US 290, replacing FM 2194. On December 19, 1956, an  section from US 290 north to FM 1155 was transferred to FM 1155.

FM 2194

FM 2194 (1953)

The original FM 2194 was designated on October 29, 1953, from US 290 (now FM 1371) at Chappell Hill north  to a road intersection. On August 24, 1954, the road was extended south  over a former section of US 290 to new US 290. FM 2194 was cancelled on September 20, 1955, and transferred to FM 2193 (now FM 1155).

FM 2195

FM 2196

Farm to Market Road 2196 (FM 2196) is located in Terry and Yoakum counties in the South Plains region.

FM 2196 begins at an intersection with SH 214 north of Plains. The highway travels in an eastern direction through rural areas with farm and ranch land with oil pumps before ending at an intersection with US 385 north of Brownfield. FM 2196 serves as a relief route for US 82/US 380 between Plains and Brownfield, as the highway runs closely parallel to that highway between the two towns.

The highway was extended  westward to a road intersection on October 26, 1954. FM 2196 was rerouted; the section from FM 402 northward 2.2 miles was transferred to the new FM 3262, and FM 2196 was rerouted to FM 1780 on October 26, 1975, replacing the old FM 3262. The highway was extended  from FM 1780 to SH 214 on January 30, 1989.

Junction list

FM 2197

FM 2198

FM 2199

Farm to Market Road 2199 (FM 2199)  is located in Harrison County. It runs 6.487 miles from FM 1998 in Scottsville south before terminating at FM 31 in unincorporated Harrison County. FM 2199 intersects both U.S. Highway 80 and I-20.

FM 2199 begins at an intersection with FM 31 in Harrison County, heading north on a two-lane undivided road. The road heads through woodland with some farmland and homes. Farther north, the highway comes to an interchange with I-20. Past this, the road heads through more rural areas, reaching an intersection with US 80. FM 2199 heads into Scottsville and runs through more agricultural areas with some woods and residences, crossing a Union Pacific railroad line and ending at FM 1998. North of here, the road becomes Harkins Lane.

FM 2199 was first designated on December 2, 1953, running from US 80 to FM 1998. The highway was extended south to FM 31 on August 24, 1955.

Junction list

Notes

References

+21
Farm to market roads 2100
Farm to Market Roads 2100